Walter Gerardo Pandiani Urquiza (born 27 April 1976) is an Uruguayan football manager and former player who played as a striker. He is the current manager of Albion.

His performances for Peñarol earned him a move to Deportivo in Spain, where he remained for the vast majority of his career, also representing Mallorca, Espanyol (twice) and Osasuna. He also spent a year with Birmingham City in England.

Over 12 seasons, Pandiani amassed La Liga totals of 279 games and 82 goals.

Playing career

Early years and Deportivo
Born in Montevideo, Pandiani started his career with hometown club Progreso, moving on to Basáñez and Peñarol, the latter also in the country's capital. In December 1999 he agreed terms to join Deportivo La Coruña as a replacement for his compatriot Sergio Martínez, and the move was officially completed the following January when he signed a five-and-a-half-year deal for an undisclosed fee, still remaining with Peñarol until the end of the season.

Pandiani made his debut for the Spaniards on 27 August 2000, coming from the bench for Diego Tristán in a 2–0 win over Espanyol at Estadio Riazor in the Supercopa de España return match. Despite never being an undisputed starter for the Galician team he was one of their most important attacking elements, often scoring as a substitute, netting 13 goals during the 2003–04 season.

Pandiani, who had a successful loan stint at Mallorca while still at Depor, moved to Birmingham City in the Premier League, also on loan, in January 2005, after a series of run-ins with coach Javier Irureta. He scored a goal on his debut against Southampton in a 2–1 home win, and went on to score three more in the season, prompting manager Steve Bruce to sign him on a permanent contract for a reported fee of £3 million.

During his time at Deportivo, Pandiani bought a big red truck which he drove to training, a type of vehicle that he is a fan of, which he kept while at Deportivo, Espanyol and Osasuna. He personalised it with his nickname "El Rifle", a Uruguayan flag, and the emblems of his club and Uruguayan club Peñarol.

Espanyol
Having failed to continue to display his previous form, Pandiani returned to Spain on 13 January 2006, after completing a move to Espanyol for £1 million.

In his first full season he scored only seven La Liga goals, including a first-half hat-trick against eventual champions Real Madrid in the Santiago Bernabéu Stadium, but was top scorer in the 2006–07 UEFA Cup with eleven as his club reached the final, which they lost on penalties to Sevilla.

During his time at Espanyol, Pandiani, and Barcelona's José Manuel Pinto, drove in the 2011 Barcelona "Monster Jam" monster truck event.

Osasuna
For 2007–08, Pandiani joined Osasuna. Scarcely used in his first year, he was instrumental for the Navarrese in the following campaign, especially after the arrival in mid-October of coach José Antonio Camacho, finishing as the club's top scorer.

Osasuna's first goal of the 2010–11 season only came in the fourth matchday, and the 34-year-old Pandiani scored it through a header as the team came from behind to win it 3–1 against Real Sociedad, at home. On 30 January 2011, during half-time of a 1–0 home win against Real Madrid, he was involved in a "verbal spat" with Cristiano Ronaldo, suggesting afterwards that "As a footballer he is a phenomenon but to do the things he does, maybe he has a screw loose."

Later career
The 35-year-old Pandiani returned to Espanyol for 2011–12, signing a one-year contract and acting mainly as backup to youth graduate Álvaro Vázquez. On 22 September he came from the bench to score the game's only goal at home against Getafe, in stoppage time. On 27 October he repeated the feat, albeit not so late in the game, with a powerful header at home to Real Betis.

In late August 2012, Pandiani signed a one-year contract with Segunda División club Villarreal, where his 18-year-old son Nico was a C-team player. On his debut, at home to Guadalajara on 2 September, he entered the game as a second-half substitute and scored the winning goal, and did the same the following week in another narrow win, at Ponferradina.

In late January 2013, Pandiani and Nico left Villarreal and joined Atlético Baleares of the Segunda División B. They both started in Nico's second senior match, and Pandiani scored in the 2–1 defeat away to Sant Andreu on 12 May.

In October 2013, the pair returned to Uruguay and signed for Primera División club Miramar Misiones. Pandiani scored three times in the six remaining matches of the 2013–14 Apertura, as his team finished next to bottom, and played regularly during the Clausura but scored only twice as they repeated their previous finish, which contributed to relegation.

Pandiani returned to the Barcelona area where he spent the 2014–15 season coaching junior teams at Masnou, where two of his sons played. He said that although he had always wanted to coach, he still thought of himself as a player and was open to offers; in June 2015, he signed for Lausanne-Sport of the Swiss Challenge League, with the remit of supervising and teaching the tricks of the trade to the 15-year-old striker Andi Zeqiri, who had already made his first-team debut. The Swiss club managed to climb to the first division in 2016 and be the oldest scorer in the history of Swiss football, a record held by the Argentine Walter Samuel.

Pandiani announced his retirement on 16 June 2016 after a 23-year professional career, at the age of 40. After he retired, his truck was auctioned in Barcelona with 518,000 miles on the clock.

International career
Despite his relatively successful career in Spain, Pandiani only received four caps for Uruguay, the first coming on 28 March 2001 in a 1–0 home defeat against Paraguay in the 2002 World Cup qualifiers.

Managerial career
Pandiani returned to Masnou after retiring, now as a first-team manager. Sacked on 2 November 2016, he was appointed at the helm of Europa's Juvenil A squad on 13 December.

On 27 June 2017, Pandiani was named manager of Hospitalet's youth squad. Two years later, he was given his first senior managerial job at Lorca in the Tercera División. He left on 30 December 2019, with the team in seventh place.

Following a spell at Dibba Al-Hisn in the United Arab Emirates, where he signed his son Axel, Pandiani was hired at Cerro in the Uruguayan Segunda División in June 2021. He lost in the promotion playoffs to Defensor in his first season and was sacked in July 2022 with the team in fourth. 

On 27 July 2022, Pandiani signed for Cerrito, in last place in the top flight. He was fired on 30 August after taking two points from five games.

On 20 December 2022, Pandiani was announced as the new manager of Albion for the 2023 season.

Style of play
Nicknamed El Rifle (the rifle), Pandiani's best assets were his strength and aerial ability.

Career statistics

International
Source:

Honours
Peñarol
Uruguayan Primera División: 1999

Deportivo
Copa del Rey: 2001–02
Supercopa de España: 2000, 2002

Mallorca
Copa del Rey: 2002–03

Espanyol
Copa del Rey: 2005–06
UEFA Cup runner-up: 2006–07

Lausanne
 Swiss Challenge League: 2015–16

References

External links

Deportivo archives

1976 births
Living people
Footballers from Montevideo
Uruguayan footballers
Association football forwards
Uruguayan Primera División players
C.A. Progreso players
Peñarol players
Miramar Misiones players
La Liga players
Segunda División players
Segunda División B players
Deportivo de La Coruña players
RCD Mallorca players
RCD Espanyol footballers
CA Osasuna players
Villarreal CF players
CD Atlético Baleares footballers
Premier League players
Birmingham City F.C. players
Swiss Challenge League players
FC Lausanne-Sport players
Uruguay international footballers
Uruguayan expatriate footballers
Expatriate footballers in Spain
Expatriate footballers in England
Expatriate footballers in Switzerland
Uruguayan expatriate sportspeople in Spain
Uruguayan expatriate sportspeople in England
Uruguayan expatriate sportspeople in Switzerland
Uruguayan football managers
C.A. Cerro managers
Club Sportivo Cerrito managers
Tercera División managers
Lorca FC managers
Uruguayan expatriate football managers
Expatriate football managers in Spain
Expatriate football managers in the United Arab Emirates
Uruguayan expatriate sportspeople in the United Arab Emirates